Eliot Hyman (1904–1980) was an American film executive who helped co-found Seven Arts Productions.

Biography
Hyman entered the film production business in 1948, when he co-founded Associated Artists. He became the sole owner of Associated Artists Productions (a.a.p.) two years later.

In 1954, he began syndicating films to television through a.a.p., acquiring the entire library of 750 feature films of Warner Bros. made before 1950, as well as 1,500 short subjects and 337 Looney Tunes/Merrie Melodies cartoon shorts also from Warner Bros. and the Fleischer Studios/Famous Studios Popeye cartoons from Paramount Pictures. He also began investing in films, including two major films of the director John Huston, Moulin Rouge (1953) and Moby Dick (1956). He helped fund and played an important role in the financing of the first horror film from Hammer Film Productions, The Curse of Frankenstein (1957).

In 1958 Hyman sold Associated Artists Productions to United Artists and became President of United Artists Associated, for whom he bought the screen rights to several successful theatrical properties, e.g. plays and musicals, that became major films, including "West Side Story", "The World of Suzie Wong", and "Two for the Seesaw". He also produced other motion pictures for theater exhibition through other companies that he formed.

In 1960 Hyman went on his own again to form Seven Arts Productions and engaged in worldwide distribution of feature films for television. At the same time Seven Arts directly financed and produced a number of films, including Lolita (1962), What Ever Happened to Baby Jane? (1962), and Seven Days in May (1964). He also guided Seven Arts into stage production, including Broadway presentations of "The Night of the Iguana", "Funny Girl", "The Owl and the Pussycat" and several other shows.

From November 1966 to July 1967, Seven Arts and Warner Bros. were merged, and the company became Warner Bros.-Seven Arts. Hyman was the chairman of Warner Bros.-Seven Arts from 1967 to 1969.

In 1969, Warner Bros.-Seven Arts was sold to Kinney National Company which dropped the Seven Arts name. Hyman retired from the company and became a private investor.

His son was the film producer Kenneth Hyman.

References

American film producers
1904 births
1980 deaths
20th-century American businesspeople